A list of films produced in South Korea in 1996:

External links
1996 in South Korea

 1996 at www.koreanfilm.org

1996
South Korean
1996 in South Korea